Bingo Players is a Dutch dance and electro house musical project fronted by DJ and record producer Maarten Hoogstraten. Bingo Players was originally a duo, which included Paul Bäumer, who died from cancer in 2013. After the death of Bäumer, Hoogstraten announced that Bäumer had wished for him to continue under the Bingo Players name. They are best known for their hit songs "Cry (Just a Little)" and "Rattle". "Cry (Just a Little)" was a top-40 hit in the Netherlands, Belgium, United Kingdom and other parts of Europe and Australia, in addition to being an international club hit. Bingo Players were ranked number 52 in DJ Mags Top 100 DJs list for 2013.

Biography
The Bingo Players was founded by Dutch DJs Maarten Hoogstraten and Paul Bäumer, in 2006.

Stylistically, the Bingo Players utilized a choppy form of tech house until 2011, where they would shift into the modern-day EDM scene seen presently. They went on to record their own remixes of several songs over the years. In addition to DJing and producing, Bingo Players own and operate Hysteria Records. The label releases many of the Bingo Players' singles in addition to tracks from other electro house producers, including Bassjackers, MAKJ, Sandro Silva, Ralvero and Gregori Klosman.

In May 2011, the Bingo Players released "Cry (Just a Little)", which borrows lyrics from Brenda Russell's "Piano in the Dark". In the same year, the Bingo Players had a hit with their original record "Rattle". The song charted in the top 40 in the Netherlands, France, Sweden and Denmark.

In 2013, a revamped version of "Rattle" titled "Get Up (Rattle)" was released and became a number one single in the United Kingdom in addition to being a top 10 hit in Germany, Austria, France, Australia and other parts of Europe. The single has been certified gold in Canada, silver in the UK, and four times platinum in Australia.

On July 19, 2013, Bäumer announced on the duo's Facebook page that he was diagnosed with cancer and that Hoogstraten would be representing the duo on the road for the remaining tour. Bäumer stated he would still be working in the studio as well as taking lead in running Hysteria Records, while seeking medical treatment.

On December 17, 2013, Bäumer died after having cancer for over a year. Hoogstraten announced the news on Facebook on December 18. He had cancelled all upcoming shows to take time off to mourn the loss with his family and friends as well as attending the funeral.

In early 2014, Bingo Players announced that Hoogstraten would be continuing on as a solo act, as per Bäumer's wishes. Around the same time, the Bingo Players released "Knock You Out", which became the group's first number one song on the US dance chart. Featuring the lyrics "My fight is won, Who needs a gun, Boom-boom, Knock you out" sung by Kim Viera, who is not credited, it is considered to be a tribute to Bäumer and his struggle with cancer.

The Bingo Players appeared at #96 on the DJ Mag Top 100 DJs for 2014.

In October 2021 Bingo Players put together a 'Bingo Players Essentials playlist' especially for the leading European music magazine Maxazine, containing the musical footprint of the dance act.

Discography

Extended plays

Singles

Remixes
2007
 UHM – House Ya (Bingo Players Remix)

2008
 UHM and Tony Flexx – Our House (Bingo Players Remix)
 Josh the Funky 1 – It's the Music (Bingo Players Remix)
 Ian Carey – Redlight (Bingo Players Remix)
 Erick E – Wanna Go Again (Bingo Players Remix)
 Groovenatics – Joy (Bingo Players Remix)
 Gio Martinez, Genetik – Pixel (Bingo Players Remix)
 Todd Terry – Uncle Tech (Bingo Players Remix)
 Soulcatcher feat. Amanda Wilson – Falling for You (Bingo Players Remix)

2009
 Ron Carroll – Bump to Dis (Bart B More Vs. Bingo Players Remix)
 Oliver Twizt – You're Not Alone (Bingo Players Remix)
 Harrison Crump – Gone (Bingo Players Remix)
 Kristine W – Feel What You Want (Bingo Players Feel It 2 Remix)
 Joachim Garraud – Are U Ready? (Bingo Players Remix)
 Villanord – Muzik (Bingo Players Remix)
 Ferry Corsten feat. Maria Nayer – We Belong (Bingo Players Remix)
 Sander van Doorn and Marco V – What Say? (Bingo Players Remix)
 Patric La Funk – Xylo (Bingo Players Remix)
 Sir James – Special (Bingo Players Remix)
 N.E.R.D – Lapdance (Bingo Players Bootleg Remix)
 Nick Supply feat. Tasha Baxter – That Bounce Track (Bingo Players Remix)
 Gel Abril – Spells of Yoruba (Bingo Players Remix)
 Martin Solveig – Poptimistic (Bingo Players Vox)
 Kid Cudi vs. Crookers – Day 'n' Nite (Bingo Players Remix)

2010
 Gramophonedzie – Why Don't You (Bingo Players Remix)
 Mastiksoul feat. Zoey – Taking Me Hi (Bingo Players Remix)
 Eddie Thoneick feat. Terri B. – Release (Bingo Players Remix)
 Kelis – Milkshake (Bingo Players Bootleg)
 The Black Eyed Peas – The Time (Dirty Bit) (Bingo Players Bootleg)
 David Guetta feat. Kid Cudi – Memories (Bingo Players Remix)
 Dany P-Jazz, Fedde Le Grand and Funkerman – New Life (Bingo Players Remix)
 Green Velvet – La La Land (Bingo Players Remix)

2011
 Sir Mix-a-Lot – Baby Got Back (Bingo Players Bootleg)
 Pitbull feat. Ne-Yo, Afrojack and Nayer – Give Me Everything (Bingo Players Remix)
 Sander van Doorn – Koko (Bingo Players Remix)
 The Prodigy – Everybody in the Place (Bingo Players Bootleg)
 Wally Lopez – Welcome Home (Bingo Players Remix)
 Manufactured Superstars feat. Scarlett Quinn – Take Me Over (Bingo Players Remix)
 Flo Rida – Good Feeling (Bingo Players Remix)

2012
 Far East Movement – Jello (Bingo Players Remix)
 Carl Tricks – Mad Dash (Bingo Players Edit)
 TJR vs. Foreigner - Cold as Oi (Bingo Players Mashup)
 Maurizio Gubellini vs. Macklemore - Who's in the Thriftshop (Bingo Players Mashup)
Daft Punk - One More Time (Bingo Players Jello Bootleg)

2013
 Dada Life – Boing Clash Boom (Bingo Players Remix)
 Duck Sauce – Radio Stereo (Bingo Players Remix)

2014
 Gorgon City - Here for You (Bingo Players Remix)

2015
 Mystery Skulls - Magic (Bingo Players' French Fried Rework)
 Hardwell feat. Jason Derulo - Follow Me (Bingo Players Remix)

2016 
 Bingo Players - "Tom's Diner" (Bingo Players 2016 Re-Work)

2017
 Charlie Puth - "Attention" (Bingo Players Remix)

2018
 Bingo Players and Goshfather - "Everybody" (Bingo Players Remix)
 Bingo Players - "Love Me Right" (Bingo Players x Oomloud Club Mix)

2019
 Ava Max - "Freaking Me Out" (Bingo Players Remix)
 Camille Jones - "The Creeps" (Bingo Players Remix)
 Laidback Luke featuring Majestic - "Pogo" (Bingo Players Remix)

2020
 Bingo Players, Felguk and Fafaq - "Devotion" (2020 Remix)

Production credits
 Flo Rida – "I Cry" (2012)
 Ne-Yo – "Forever Now" (2012)
 Alexis Jordan – "Acid Rain" (2013)

See also
List of artists who reached number one on the US Dance chart

References

External links
 Official website

Dutch dance music groups
Dutch musical duos
Dutch house music groups
Electro house musicians
Electronic dance music duos
Musical groups established in 2006
2006 establishments in the Netherlands
Spinnin' Records artists